Handheld electronic games are interactive electronic games, often miniaturized versions of video games, that are played on portable handheld devices, known as handheld game consoles, whose controls, display and speakers are all part of a single unit. Rather than a general-purpose screen made up of a grid of small pixels, they usually have custom displays designed to play one game. This simplicity means they can be made as small as a smartwatch, and sometimes are. The visual output of these games can range from a few small light bulbs or LED lights to calculator-like alphanumerical screens; later these were mostly displaced by liquid crystal and vacuum fluorescent display screens with detailed images and in the case of VFD games, color.  Handhelds' popularity was at its peak from the late 1970s into the early 1990s before declining. They are the precursors to the handheld game console.

History
Early handheld games used simple mechanisms to interact with players, often limited to illuminated buttons and sound effects. Early handheld games include Mattel Auto Race (1976) and Mattel Electronic Football (1977), which have simple red-LED displays; gameplay involves pressing buttons to move a car or quarterback icon (represented by a bright dot) to avoid obstacles (represented by less bright dots).

In 1978 the Milton Bradley Company entered the handheld market with Simon, a simple color-and-sound-matching game.  Simon had no dedicated display, but featured four colored, lighted buttons; the original version was large enough to be used as a tabletop game or a handheld; later versions became increasingly smaller.  The same year, Parker Brothers also released Merlin, a more sophisticated handheld which could play six different games using an array of 11 buttons with integrated LEDs.  Despite their relative simplicity, each of these early games was highly successful.  

The initial success of Mattel and Parker Brothers' entries spawned a wave of similar handheld devices which were released through the early 1980s.  Notable among these were a series of popular 2-player "head-to-head" games from Coleco.  Other games were miniaturized versions of popular arcade video games.

In 1979, Gunpei Yokoi, traveling on a bullet train, saw a bored businessman playing with an LCD calculator by pressing the buttons. Yokoi then thought of an idea for a watch that doubled as a miniature game machine for killing time. Starting in 1980, Nintendo began to release a series of electronic games designed by Yokoi called the Game & Watch games. Taking advantage of the technology used in the credit-card-sized calculators that had appeared on the market, Yokoi designed the series of LCD-based games to include a digital time display in the corner of the screen.  For later, more complicated Game & Watch games, Yokoi invented a cross shaped directional pad or "D-pad" for control of on-screen characters. Yokoi also included his directional pad on the Famicom game console's controllers, and the cross-shaped thumb controller soon became standard on game console controllers and ubiquitous across the video game industry as a replacement for the joystick.

During the 1980s, LCDs became inexpensive and largely replaced LED displays in handheld games.  The use of custom images in LCD and VFD games allows them to have greater detail and avoid the blocky, pixellated look of console screens, but not without drawbacks. All graphics are fixed in place, so every possible location and state of game objects has to be preset (and are usually visible when resetting a game), with no overlap. Illusion of movement is created by sequentially flashing objects between their possible states. Backgrounds for these games are static drawings, layered behind the "moving" graphics which are transparent when not in use.  Partly due to these limitations, the gameplay of early LCD games was often even more crude than for their LED antecedents. 

Some of the more well-known handheld games of the LCD era are the Game & Watch series by Nintendo and the games by Tiger Electronics, and many titles from other companies were also popular, especially conversions of arcade games. New games are still being made, but most are based on relatively simple card and board games.

Bandai LCD Solarpower 

In 1982, the Bandai LCD Solarpower series were the first solar-powered gaming devices. Some of its games, such as the horror-themed game Terror House, featured two LCD panels, one stacked on the other, for an early 3D effect. In 1983, Takara Tomy's Tomytronic 3D series simulated 3D by having two LED panels that were lit by external light through a window on top of the device, making it the first dedicated home video 3D hardware.

The LCD Solarpower series are handheld electronic games powered by solar energy made by Bandai in 1982. The games in the Double Panel series feature two LCD panels stacked on top of each other. This allows these games to progress in 2 stages for more variation in game play.

Games 
It comprises the following games:

First series:

, ref. 16265 and 16813 for the re-release
, ref. 16264
 / (Sub Patrol in UK), ref. 16280
, ref. 16282
, ref. 16281
, ref. 16288, released in Japan only

Second series (Double Panel):

, ref. 16815
, ref. 16814
, ref. 16817
, ref. 16818

Other handheld games were built as flipcases and had two or even three LCDs with different foreground and background scenes, offering some variety in the gameplay.

Handhelds today

Despite the increasing sophistication of handheld consoles such as the Nintendo Switch, dedicated handhelds continue to find a niche. Among technophilic gamer subcultures like Akiba-kei, unique control schemes like that of the 2008 Tuttuki Bako have been proven salable due to novelty, however dedicated handhelds such as this are uncommon. Adult fads such as blackjack, poker, and Sudoku also spawn dozens of original and knockoff handheld games. 

The Chinese/Russian Brick Game, popular in the early 1990s, include games using a 10 × 20 block grid as a crude, low resolution dot matrix screen. Such devices often have many variations of Tetris and sometimes even other kinds of games like racing, Breakout or even shoot 'em up, such as those resembling Galaga or Battle City, where one block projects blocks at the "enemy" blocks. The most advanced of these designs usually have 26 distinct games sorted in  alphabetical letters and feature multi-channel sound, voice synthesis or digital sounds samples, and internal CMOS memory which can save the current game progress and high scores when the system is turned off. Many of these handhelds with a dozen such games are marketed as having hundreds or even thousands of games (e.g. "9999 in 1"), though the vast majority are just different speed and difficulty settings. The most basic can now be sold as low as $1

At the lowest end of handheld game sophistication, there is also the "avoid/catch the falling objects" game. These games are controlled with 2 movement buttons, and sport a screen with a column of player positions, and rows of projectiles to animate towards the player. The player and projectiles could be any picture, from tanks dodging missiles to a dog catching sausages.

See also

 Calculator gaming
 Dedicated console
 Handheld game console
 Mobile game

References

External links
 Electronic Handheld Game Museum - the largest handheld museum on the web
 Handheld Empire - collectors site cataloguing 70s' 80s' handheld games
 Handheld History - Collection of 74 emulations of electronic handheld games

 
Prequels
Video game prequels